St Peter's Church, formally The Church of St Peter with St James, is an Anglican parish church in the city centre of Nottingham, England. It is part of the parish of All Saints', St Mary's and St Peter's, Nottingham.

The church is Grade I listed by the Department for Culture, Media and Sport as a building of outstanding architectural or historic interest.

History
St Peter's is one of the three mediaeval parish churches in Nottingham, the others being St Mary's and St Nicholas. The parish of St. James' Church, Standard Hill, founded in 1807 was united with St Peter's in 1933 and the official title "St Peter with St James" came into being. (St James's was demolished a few years later; some monuments from St James's are preserved in St Peter's.)

The church shows traces of many stages of construction from about 1180 onwards (the original church of around 1100 was destroyed by fire).

List of incumbents

Music

St Peter's has a new organ, a choir and a series of Saturday morning concerts. The Organist & Director of Music since 2007 is Peter Siepmann.

Choir

The choral tradition at St Peter's was developed by Vincent Trivett (Organist 1906–1947), Kendrick Partington (Organist 1957–1994) and others.  The choir sings in church every Sunday and frequently has concert performances. The choir often sings in other churches and cathedrals across the UK and abroad. This began with a visit to Lichfield Cathedral in 1969. In 2008 the choir sang the services for several days at Westminster Abbey.

Concerts

St Peter's has a regular series of Saturday morning 'coffee break' concerts. These were started in 1988. The church also occasionally hosts more formal evening performances.

Organ
The first organ since the Commonwealth period was installed by Lincoln in 1812. This was enlarged by Lloyd and Dudgeon in 1863 and has been adapted and restored several times since by E. Wragg & Son, Henry Willis & Sons and Hill, Norman & Beard. In 1952, much of the organ of St Columba, Mansfield Road was incorporated into the St Peter's instrument.

A new organ was installed in 2010, and combines some ranks of new and re-used pipes with digital simulations of most stops. It is situated in the North-East corner of the church, retaining a historic eighteenth century case. The organ has been designed as a recital instrument, and to provide support for congregational singing, as well as accompanying the church's choir.

Organists
There are notes of payments to organists in the fifteenth and sixteenth centuries
1481-1482 And for 5s paid to the organist (lusori ad organa) in the aforesaid Church in this year. 
1516/17 - 1517/18 And for 6s 11d paid to Robert Dowse, organist, at the request of the greater part of the parishioners, in augmentation of his salary.
On 25 October 1785, William Bradley was allowed one guinea for teaching the boys to sing.
Organist paid £12/12 in 1816 but cost was not borne by the church.

Clock
In 1552 Edward VI's commissioners delivered to 'parson' Nicholas Cooke a clock in the 'steeple', which had probably been there since the fifteenth century. The earliest reference in the church records ' the church of St Peter's in the  lord god 1577 2 sh. to Toms Lockwood for looking after the clock.'

In 1723–4, the Chamberlains' Account record a payment of £1 to the Sexton of St Peter's for ringing a 4 o’clock bell.

On Wednesday 29 April 1846, a vestry meeting was called to consider the offer of new church clock. On Thursday 15 October 1846, as Richard Ward, a man employed by Messrs. Taylor and Garrett, was assisting in taking down the old face of St. Peter's church clock, when it gave way. A rope attached to it dragged him with it.

The new clock was installed in 1847, manufactured by Reuben Bosworth at a cost of £125 and was at the time, the largest in Nottingham. It was an eight-day clock with four dials, each  in diameter. The clock was tested for several weeks before the hand on the dials were connected to the mechanism on 7 April 1847. On Christmas Eve 1852 a hurricane broke off one of the minute hands of the clock.

New cast iron clock dials,  in diameter were presented by Henry Smith to the church in 1872 at a cost of £66.

A new clock was installed by G. & F. Cope in 1881 which had a Denison Remontoire, compensation pendulum and wire rope lines. The strike was provided by a hammer on the hour bell on E. This was replaced by an electrically driven clock by Smiths of Derby in 1965.

References

Alfred Stapleton, 1905, Churches and monasteries of old and new Nottingham
Keith Train, 1981, Train on churches, Nottingham

External links

Southwell Diocesan Church History Project Website
 Pictures of St.Peter's from Nottingham21
See St. Peter's Church on Google Street View.

Nottingham St Peter
Nottingham, St Peter
Nottingham St Peter's Church